Pedro Reyes may refer to:

 Pedro Reyes (footballer) (born 1972), Chilean football defender
 Pedro Reyes (artist) (born 1972), Mexican artist
 Pedro Reyes (comedian) (1961–2015), Spanish comedian and actor
Pedro Orlando Reyes (born 1959), Cuban amateur boxer